Grundy County High School (GCHS) is a public high school near Coalmont, Tennessee that serves students in Grundy County, Tennessee. It is the only high school in the Grundy County Schools system.

History
The school was founded in 1928, replacing an older school. The original building was destroyed by fire in March 1935, and classes did not resume until 1940, when a new school building was built.

Demographics
The ethnic makeup of the school is approximately 99.0% Non-Hispanic White, 0.7% Hispanic or Latino, 0.1% Asian, and 0.1% from two or more races. Approximately 52.5% of students are male and 47.5% are female.

Athletics
The school's mascot is the yellow jacket, and its colors are purple and vegas gold. It competes in the Tennessee Secondary School Athletic Association (TSSAA). Its sports are:
Football
Baseball
Softball
Boys' Basketball 
Girls' Basketball - state championship (1998)
Boys' Cross Country
Girls' Cross Country
Boys' Golf
Girls' Golf
Cheerleading
Volleyball

References

Public high schools in Tennessee
Educational institutions established in 1928
1928 establishments in Tennessee
Grundy County, Tennessee